Yikezhaogia is an extinct genus of therocephalian therapsids from the Early Triassic of Mongolia. It is known from a single fragmentary skull and associated postcranial bones representing the species Yikezhaogia megafenestrala. It is identifiable as a therocephalian by its thin postorbital bar behind the eye socket, its elongated temporal opening behind the bar, and a thin lower jaw with a low coronoid process. Large tooth sockets in the upper jaw indicate that Yikezhaogia had large caniniform teeth. The teeth of the lower jaw are blunt-tipped and cylindrical. Although its exact position among therocephalians is uncertain, Yikezhaogia is probably a basal member of the group Baurioidea.

References

Early Triassic synapsids
Triassic synapsids of Asia
Baurioids
Fossil taxa described in 1984
Therocephalia genera